Glenwood Cemetery is located in West Long Branch, Monmouth County, New Jersey.  The cemetery is located at the intersection of Route 36 and Monmouth Road.

Notable interments
 Mike Donlin, aka "Turkey Mike" (1878–1933), Major League Baseball Player and movie actor; known as "Turkey Mike" because of his unique strut
 George Fotheringham (1883–1971), Scottish-American professional golfer
 Wallace McCutcheon Sr. (1862–1918), cinematographer and director
 Arthur Pryor, (1870–1942), jazz trombonist and bandleader with the Sousa Band and New Jersey politician

References

External links
 West Long Branch Glenwood Cemetery CountyOffice.org
 
   

Cemeteries in Monmouth County, New Jersey